Enrique Giaverini (born December 20, 1908, date of death unknown) was a Chilean boxer who competed in the 1936 Summer Olympics.

In 1936 he was eliminated in the first round of the welterweight class after losing his fight to the upcoming bronze medalist Gerhard Pedersen.

External links

Enrique Giaverini's profile at Sports Reference.com

1908 births
Year of death missing
Chilean people of Italian descent
Welterweight boxers
Olympic boxers of Chile
Boxers at the 1936 Summer Olympics
Chilean male boxers
20th-century Chilean people